Disca paulum is a moth of the family Erebidae first described by Michael Fibiger in 2007. It is known from mid-western Thailand.

The wingspan is 11–12 mm. The forewing is relatively broad. The hindwing is greyish brown and the underside unicolorous greyish brown.

References

Micronoctuini
Moths described in 2007
Taxa named by Michael Fibiger